The Politics of Reality: Essays in Feminist Theory is a 1983 collection of feminist essays by philosopher Marilyn Frye. Some of these essays, developed through speeches and lectures she gave, have been quoted and reprinted often, and the book has been described as a "classic" of feminist theory.

Summary
Frye outlines several key concepts and fundamental issues for feminist theory. In the first essay, "Oppression", she explains a structural vision of oppression:
Oppression is a system of interrelated barriers and forces which reduce, immobilize and mold people who belong to a certain group, and effect their subordination to another group (individually to individuals of the other group, and as a group, to that group).  She uses the analogy of a bird cage to explain why many people do not see oppression:
If you look very closely at just one wire in the cage, you cannot see the other wires. If your conception of what is before you is determined by this myopic focus, you could look at that one wire, up and down the length of it, and be unable to see why a bird would not just fly around the wire any time it wanted to go somewhere ... It is only when you step back, stop looking at the wires one by one, microscopically, and take a macroscopic view of the whole cage, that you can see why the bird does not go anywhere; and then you will see it in a moment.  The second essay, "Sexism", clearly illustrates sexism as a specific form of oppression.

As a philosopher, Frye grounds her arguments in epistemological questions and moral inquiry. An example, from her introduction, is: What feminist theory is about, to a great extent, is just identifying those forces...and displaying the mechanics of their applications to women as a group (or caste) and to individual women. The measure of the success of the theory is just how much sense it makes of what did not make sense before.

Her essay 'On Separation and Power' is a justification for separate space for oppressed groups.

'On Being White: Thinking Toward a Feminist Understanding of Race and Race Supremacy' is an example of a radical lesbian feminist philosopher talking through the process of analysing her own attitudes about racism and how that fits within feminism.

Reception
The book has been cited widely by other feminist theorists. For example, Sheila Jeffreys quotes from the introduction in Beauty and Misogyny.

In Claudia Card's review of the essays, she praises Frye's clear writing style as well as the essay's progressive contributions to feminist theory.

References

1983 non-fiction books
American non-fiction books
Debut books
English-language books
Essay collections
Feminist theory
Radical feminist books